Hunter's Home (Dutch: Jagerswoning) is an 1826 oil painting by the Belgian artist Henry Voordecker. The painting depicts a hunter at home, surrounded by animals and members of his family; a typical genre painting.  It is in the collection of the Rijksmuseum in Amsterdam.  

It is in a typical Biedermeier style and its themes are characterized by the reinforced feelings of security, gemütlichkeit, traditional simplicity, portraying a sentimental view of the world.

The painting depicts a family at the doorway of their home.  The dwelling is brick-built, with a vine scrambling around the arched stone doorway.  A mother with a child sit in front of a young man in hunting clothes with a dog (perhaps a Dutch Partridge Dog) and a hunting gun. Chickens and doves are on the steps in front of the doorway; a magpie is in a cage beside the door, and more doves around a dovecote to the left.  To the left of the steps stands another child, and a young woman doing laundry, with a horned white cow in a stable to the far left. To the right of the door is a second dog on a chain, various domestic pots and pans on the roof of a wooden kennel or henhouse, and a potted plant with small red flowers (perhaps a pelargonium) on a window ledge.  

It is signed and dated "H. Voordecker fecit 1826", and measures .  It was acquired by the Rijksmuseum in Amsterdam in 1828.

References

Paintings in the collection of the Rijksmuseum
Genre paintings
1826 paintings
Birds in art
Dogs in art
Paintings of children
Cattle in art